Research Letters in Physics is an open-access scientific journal publishing short (up to 4 pages) papers in the broad field of physics. The journal was established in 2007 and is published by the Hindawi Publishing Corporation. It ceased publications in 2017.

Abstracting and indexing 
The journal is abstracted and indexed in Academic OneFile, Academic Search Premier, Chemical Abstracts, EBSCO databases, InfoTrac, INSPEC, International Nuclear Information System, and Scopus.

External links
 

Physics journals
Hindawi Publishing Corporation academic journals
Publications established in 2007
Publications disestablished in 2017
English-language journals